Sandblasted is the third EP release by English alternative rock band Swervedriver. Self-produced and recorded by the band, it was released on 22 July 1991, through Creation and A&M Records. The title track of the EP was included in the band's debut album, Raise (1991) and was released as their debut single, peaking at number 67 on UK Singles Chart.

Background
On the song's meaning, Adam Franklin stated:

A promotional music video for the track was also released.

Critical reception

Andy Kellman of AllMusic wrote: "Sandblasted again offers three great B-sides from the band, which boasts some nasty, digging, non-flashy guitar riffs from guitarists Adam Franklin and Jimmy Hartridge." He also further stated: "When most bands of this era put out a fraction of material this good, they realized they could do no better and packed it in. Swervedriver, however, were just warming up." Steve Sutherland of Melody Maker described the title track as "a head-on collision between guitars raging for chaos and a song that encompasses both the world-weary and the wonderstruck in time-honoured romantic tradition."

Track listing
EP
 "Sandblasted" – 5:41
 "Flawed" – 3:55
 "Out" – 3:24
 "Laze It Up" – 6:46

7" single
 "Sandblasted" – 5:41
 "Out" – 3:24

Personnel

Swervedriver
 Adam Franklin – vocals, guitar
 Jimmy Hartridge – guitar
 Adi Vines – bass guitar 
 Graham Bonnar – drums

Other personnel
 Philip Ames – engineering
 MAX – mastering
 Anjali Dutt – mixing
 Designland – sleeve design
 Swervedriver – production

Chart performances
7" single

References

External links
 

1991 EPs
Swervedriver EPs
Creation Records EPs
A&M Records EPs
Creation Records singles
A&M Records singles
1991 debut singles
1991 songs